Bujanovac is a town and municipality located in the Pčinja District of southern Serbia. As of 2022 census, the municipality has a population of 42,634 inhabitants.

Situated in the South Morava basin, it is located in the geographical area known as Preševo Valley. It is also known for its source of mineral water and spa town Bujanovačka banja. Ethnically, Serbs are the largest ethnic group in the town, while the largest ethnic group in the municipality are Albanians.

History

Ancient history
Kale-Krševica, located south of Ristovac, is an archaeological site of a 5th-century BC Ancient city of Macedon, thought to be Damastion. The Thracian Triballi and Paeonian Agrianes dwelled in the region, with the Scordisci settling here after the Gallic invasion of the Balkans in 279 BC. The region was conquered by the Romans after 75 BC. It became part of the Roman propraetorial province Moesia in 29 BC (imperial from 27 BC). In 87 AD the region was re-organized into the Moesia Superior, which was a province of the Roman Empire.

Medieval Serbian era
Medieval Serbian state like the Kingdom of Serbia or the Serbian Empire included part of this region in the 12th century and most of it until the 14th century. Since the 15th century, the region was under Ottoman administration.

Ottoman era
It became part of Rumelia, as a historical term describing the area now referred to as the Balkans or the Balkan Peninsula when it was administrated by the Ottoman Empire.

After the Berlin agreement, signed in 1878, there were some administrative changes in the Ottoman Empire. Bujanovac – then Buyanofça – and its surroundings became part of the "Preševo area" of the Priština District and in 1905–1912 Bujanovac belonged to the 2nd category of borough covering 28 villages. After the Balkan Wars, the area belonged to Kumanovo District of the Kingdom of Serbia.

Yugoslavia (1918–92)
After the establishment of the Kingdom of Serbs, Croats and Slovenians, in 1918, Bujanovac became part of Vranje Oblast, which was formed in 1921 after the Vidovdan Constitution. With administrative changes in 1929, it became part of Vardar Banovina, with the town of Skopje as capital. With the forming of Democratic Federal Yugoslavia, it was part of Socialist Republic of Serbia from 1943 to 1992. After World War II, in 1947, Bujanovac was established as one of 117 municipalities of Central Serbia, under its own name.

From 1945 until 1992 Bujanovac was part of Socialist Republic of Serbia, within SFR Yugoslavia.

Breakup of Yugoslavia (1991–99)

In 1992, the Albanians in the area organized a referendum in which they voted that Bujanovac, Preševo and Medveđa should join the self-declared assembly of the Republic of Kosova. However, no major events happened until the end of the 1990s.

Following the breakup of Yugoslavia, and nearby Kosovo War which lasted until 1999, between 1999 and 2001, an ethnic Albanian paramilitary separatist organization, the UÇPMB, raised an armed insurgency in the Preševo Valley, in the region mostly inhabited by Albanians, with a goal to occupy these three municipalities from Serbia and join them to the self-proclaimed Republic of Kosova.

Unlike in the case of Kosovo, western countries condemned the attacks and described it as the "extremism" and use of "illegal terrorist actions" by the group. Following the overthrow of Slobodan Milošević, the new Yugoslav government suppressed the violence by 2001 and defeated the separatists. NATO troops also helped the Yugoslav government by ensuring that the rebels do not import the conflicts back into Kosovo. Thereafter, the situation has stabilized even though large number of forces exist in this small municipality.

In 2009, Serbia opened a military base Cepotina five kilometers south of Bujanovac, to further stabilize the area.

Modern
Today, Bujanovac is located in the Pčinja District of southern Serbia.

On 7 March 2017, the President of Albania Bujar Nishani made a historical visit to the municipalities of Bujanovac and Preševo, in which Albanians form the ethnic majority.

Settlements
Aside from the town of Bujanovac, the municipality includes the following settlements:

 Baraljevac
 Biljača
 Bogdanovac
 Božinjevac
 Borovac
 Bratoselce
 Breznica
 Brnjare
 Buštranje
 Čar
 Dobrosin
 Donje Novo Selo
 Drežnica
 Đorđevac
 Gramada
 Gornje Novo Selo
 Jablanica
 Jastrebac
 Karadnik
 Klenike
 Klinovac
 Končulj
 Košarno
 Krševica
 Kuštica
 Letovica
 Levosoje
 Lopardince
 Lučane
 Lukarce
 Ljiljance
 Mali Trnovac
 Muhovac
 Negovac
 Nesalce
 Oslare
 Pretina
 Pribovce
 Rakovac
 Ravno Bučje
 Rusce
 Samoljica
 Sebrat
 Sejace
 Spančevac
 Srpska Kuća
 Sveta Petka
 Starac
 Suharno
 Trejak
 Turija
 Uzovo
 Veliki Trnovac
 Vogance
 Vrban
 Zarbince
 Žbevac
 Žuželjica

Demographics

According to the 2002 census, the municipality of Bujanovac had a population of 43,302 people. Most of the municipality population live in rural areas, with only 27.74% living in the urban parts. The municipality of Bujanovac has 59 inhabited places. As of 2022 census, the municipality has a population of 42,634 inhabitants.

Ethnic groups
The majority of the municipality population according to the 2002 census are Albanians, encompassing 54.69% of the total population. During the 2011 census, undercounting of the census units, owing to the boycott by most of the members of the Albanian ethnic community in the municipality of Bujanovac, was reported. The ethnic composition of the municipality is as follows:

Culture and society

Sports
Bujanovac has a number of football teams, the most notable being BSK Bujanovac, Kf Tërnoci and KF Besa.

Economy
The following table gives a preview of total number of registered people employed in legal entities per their core activity (as of 2018):

Gallery

International cooperation
  Lillehammer, Norway
  Valbonë, Albania

Notable people
 Nexhat Daci, Kosovan politician
 Gjelbrim Taipi, Albanian footballer
  Berat Djimsiti, Albanian footballer
  Shaip Kamberi, Politician
  Lumir Abdixhiku, Kosovan politician
  Arbnor Fejzullahu, Albanian footballer
Ajet Sopi Bllata, Albanian rebel

See also
 List of places in Serbia
 Albanians in Serbia

References

Notes

External links

 Official website

 
Populated places in Pčinja District
Municipalities and cities of Southern and Eastern Serbia
Albanian communities in Serbia